Jonathan Baker may refer to:

 Jonathan Baker (bishop) (born 1966), Bishop of Fulham
 Jonathan Baker (judge) (born 1955), judge of the High Court of England and Wales
 Jonathan Baker (racing driver) (born 1959), British racing driver
 Jonathan Baker (producer) (born 1962), American film producer

See also
 John Baker (disambiguation)
 Jonathan Barker (c. 1952–2018), American-born Canadian film producer